Doshman Ziari District is a district (bakhsh) in Mamasani County, Fars Province, Iran. At the 2006 census, its population was 10,196, in 2,526 families.  The District has no cities. The District has two rural districts (dehestan): Doshman Ziari Rural District and Mashayekh Rural District.

References 

Mamasani County
Districts of Fars Province